Gilad Menashe Erdan (born 30 September 1970) is an Israeli politician and diplomat serving as Permanent Representative of Israel to the United Nations since 2020. 

Erdan previously served as Ambassador of Israel to the United States. A member of the Knesset for Likud from 2003 to 2020, and holder of several ministerial positions, including Minister of Environmental Protection (2009–2013), Communications (2013–2014), Home Front Defense (2013–2014), Interior (2014–2015), Minister of Public Security (2015–2020), Minister of Strategic Affairs and Public Diplomacy (2015–2020) and Minister of Regional Cooperation (2020).

Background and personal life
Gilad Menashe Erdan was born in Ashkelon. He is of Romanian Jewish and Hungarian Jewish descent. He attained the rank of captain during his military service in the Adjutant Corps of the IDF. After his military service, he studied law at Bar-Ilan University, gaining an LL.B., and started working as an attorney. Later on, he gained a master's degree in political science from Tel-Aviv University (cum laude). Erdan is married with four children, and when in Israel, he lives in Kiryat Ono.

Political career
Erdan began his political activity in opposition to the Oslo Accords, during his legal studies in the early 1990s. In these circumstances he met with then Likud MK Ariel Sharon, and soon started working as Sharon's political advisor. When Likud won the elections in 1996, Erdan was appointed as an advisor to Prime Minister Benjamin Netanyahu and as director of the Department for Public Inquiries to the Prime Minister's Office between 1996 and 1998. In February 1998, Erdan was elected by a vast majority as the chairman of "Young Likud", and served in this position for 6 years. During his term as Young Likud chairman, Erdan led many of the party's ideological and field activities in opposition to Ehud Barak's government.

Member of Knesset 
Erdan was first elected to the 16th Knesset in the 2003 elections. During his first term in the Knesset, Erdan was one of the most outspoken opponents of the unilateral Disengagement Plan from the Gaza Strip lead by Prime Minister Ariel Sharon from the Likud. In November 2005, Faced with harsh opposition to his plan, Sharon left Likud with several other MKs, and created a new party, Kadima. Erdan remained in Likud and after winning fourth place in the party's primaries, retained his seat in the 17th Knesset in the 2006 elections despite Likud's collapse from 40 to 12 seats in the Knesset. Erdan was re-elected to the 18th Knesset in 2009.

Serving as Member of Knesset, Erdan has supported boosting ties between Israel and Evangelical Christians, as well as presenting bills to enforce no-smoking laws, permanently revoking the driving licenses of serial traffic offenders, and allowing the courts to revoke citizenship for citizens visiting enemy countries or acquiring citizenship from such countries. The latter bill was submitted following Israeli Arab MK Azmi Bishara's visit to Syria, an enemy-state to the state of Israel.

In the 32nd Government 
After the 2009 elections to the Knesset, Erdan was appointed Minister of Environmental Protection, and the Minister in charge of coordinating between the Government and the Knesset in the 32nd Government. Upon the government taking office, he expressed support for Avigdor Lieberman's speech opposing the Annapolis Conference and international pressure. He commented that "Israel does not take orders from Obama" and that "citizens of Israel have decided that they will not become the fifty first US state".

As Minister of Environmental Protection, Erdan introduced the most comprehensive River Restoration program to date, legislated and enforced the protection of beaches and the coastline, increased recycling through a bottling and packaging law, and created the Beer Sheva River Park – an ecological park built on a former garbage dump – where thousands of people enjoy bike paths, walking trails, a lake, sports area, and a botanical garden. He initiated a "pollution has no borders" policy which included reducing Israel's Greenhouse Gas Emissions, increasing water desalination, in an effort to make Israel the world leader in water recycling. He also imposed limitations on the import and export of living monkeys for medical purposes, resulting in the closure of the "Mazor Farm", a disputed monkey-breeding farm.

In May 2009, Erdan was declared "man of the decade" by Or Yarok, a prominent road safety NGO in Israel, for his lasting efforts to reduce traffic accidents and fatalities.

In the 33rd Government 

Following the 2013 elections to the Knesset, Erdan was appointed the Minister of Communications and Minister of Home Front Defense in the 33rd Government. He was also appointed as a member of the Security Cabinet. On 22 April 2014, after several ongoing disputes with the Defense Minister, Moshe (Bogi) Yaalon, on matters of authority, Erdan announced his resignation as the Minister of Home Front Defense, and called the Prime-Minister to dissolve the Ministry entirely. The ministry was shut down subsequently.

In November 2014 Erdan was appointed Minister of Interior following Gideon Sa'ar's resignation.

In the 34th Government 
On 24 May 2015, Prime Minister Netanyahu appointed Erdan as Minister of Public Security, Strategic Affairs and Public Diplomacy in the 34th Government. Erdan was again appointed as a member of the Security Cabinet. Erdan's appointment came eleven days after he initially refused to join Netanyahu's cabinet, claiming he wasn't offered enough tools to make a real change as a Minister.

As the Minister of Public Security, Erdan was in charge of the National Police, Prison Service and the Fire & Rescue Services. As Minister of Strategic Affairs and Public Diplomacy, Erdan received the responsibility to coordinate the national response to the attempts to delegitimize the State of Israel, and spearhead the fight against the Boycott, Divestment and Sanctions campaign against Israel.

Upon entering his role, the state of Israel started facing a new wave of Palestinian terror attacks, carried out mainly by incited individuals, and commonly referred to as the "Knife Intifada". Erdan's plan to deal with this new wave of terror, consisted of several steps: strengthening police presence in Jerusalem, which became a symbol for terrorists; outlawing Muslim organizations who incited against Jews and harassed them on the Temple Mount; and dealing with online incitement. In addition, Erdan initiated the construction and opening of new police stations in East Jerusalem, signaling to the residents of its neighborhoods that the state of Israel will not give up its sovereignty in these areas.

In his attempts to deal with online incitement against Israelis and Jews by Palestinians, which often could lead to terror attacks, Erdan and his colleague, Minister of Justice Ayelet Shaked, proposed the so-called Facebook bill that will enable Israeli courts to issue decrees against social media companies like Facebook, Google or Twitter to remove public content deemed to be a threat to national security, public security, or a violation of the law, in case the social media company failed to detect and remove the content on its own. The bill has been criticized for allegedly limiting free speech online. However, following the submission of the bill, a senior delegation from Facebook arrived in Israel to meet with Erdan, agreeing to work together in order to improve the detection and removal of inciting material online.

in 2018, Erdan initiated new legislation intended to partially de-criminalize the use of Cannabis for recreational purposes. The reform, which was recommended by a professional committee appointed by Erdan, was called "Responsible Decriminalization", since it didn't go all the way to legalize Cannabis, but instead made private recreational use punishable by fines. The rationale for this move, explained Erdan, was to prevent unnecessary arrests and criminal records on one hand, while retaining deterrence from usage of Cannabis in the public sphere. "The current policy has failed and has not caused a decrease in the use of drugs. Cannabis is a dangerous drug, and there has been a significant increase in its use. ... But the right way to operate is via the path of education, prevention and rehabilitation rather than criminal enforcement against regular citizens."

Minister Erdan also established The Child Online Protection Bureau which created a hotline (#105) and intelligence agency to protect children and teens online. The first of its kind in the world, 105 hotline brought together an interdisciplinary team of experts from the Police, Justice Department, Welfare and Education Ministries. They have been able to successfully identify and prosecute predators, stop bullying, shaming, and online violence.

Permanent Representative to the UN
On 11 May 2020, following the 2020 elections to the Knesset, Prime-Minister Netanyahu announced that Erdan would become Israel's next Ambassador to the UN and also become Israel's Ambassador to the United States after the 2020 presidential election. The last person to hold those two positions concurrently was the diplomat and politician, Abba Eban, in the 1950s.

On 17 May 2020, Erdan was sworn in as Regional Cooperation Minister of Israel in the 35th Government. However, his appointment was short-lived, as he was made Permanent Representative of Israel to the United Nations and the Israeli ambassador to the United States. The following year, he stepped down as ambassador to the U.S. and was replaced by Mike Herzog, who succeeded him on 15 November 2021.

On June 7, 2022, Erdan was elected as Vice President of the General Assembly as the representative of the Western states.

Public activities
Outside the Knesset, Erdan was elected in 2005 as chairman of Al Sam, a non-governmental non-profit organization dealing with drug issues of youths (he also served on the Knesset's Committee on Drug Abuse), and also established the Lobby for Soldiers Missing in Action. Erdan was also a member of the Israel Broadcasting Authority's General Assembly.

References

External links

1970 births
Living people
Bar-Ilan University alumni
Israeli people of Hungarian-Jewish descent
Israeli people of Romanian-Jewish descent
Likud politicians
Members of the 16th Knesset (2003–2006)
Members of the 17th Knesset (2006–2009)
Members of the 18th Knesset (2009–2013)
Members of the 19th Knesset (2013–2015)
Members of the 20th Knesset (2015–2019)
Members of the 21st Knesset (2019)
Members of the 22nd Knesset (2019–2020)
Ministers of Environment of Israel
Ministers of Internal Affairs of Israel
Ministers of Public Security of Israel
People from Ashkelon
Tel Aviv University alumni
Members of the 23rd Knesset (2020–2021)
Permanent Representatives of Israel to the United Nations
Ambassadors of Israel to the United States
Ministers of Communications of Israel